Paul Willard McCullough (July 28, 1898 – November 7, 1970) was a Major League Baseball pitcher.

External links

1898 births
1970 deaths
Major League Baseball pitchers
Baseball players from Pennsylvania
Washington Senators (1901–1960) players